"Put Your Hands Up (If You Feel Love)", the fourth single from the 2010 album Aphrodite by Kylie Minogue
 "Put Your Hearts Up", the 2011 debut single by American actress-singer Ariana Grande